Anacostia Park is operated by the United States National Park Service. It is one of Washington, D.C.'s largest and most important recreation areas, with over 1200 acres (4.9 km2) at multiple sites. Included in Anacostia Park is Kenilworth Park and Aquatic Gardens and Kenilworth Marsh. Hundreds of acres are available for ballfields, picnicking, basketball, tennis, and the Anacostia Park Pavilion has some 3300 square feet (307 m2) of space for roller skating and special events. The Langston Golf Course offers an 18-hole course as well as a driving range, and three concession-operated marinas, four boat clubs, and a public boat ramp provide for access to the tidal Anacostia River for recreational boating.

"Eagles' Nest", the headquarters of the United States Park Police helicopter aviation unit is located in Anacostia Park.  Additionally, the headquarters of National Capital Parks-East is located within the park.

References

External links
National Park Service - Anacostia Park web page

Anacostia
National Capital Parks-East
National Park Service areas in Washington, D.C.
Parks in Washington, D.C.